The Charles A. Grignon Mansion is located in Kaukauna, Wisconsin, United States. It was added to the National Register of Historic Places in 1972.

History
The Mansion was built by Charles A. Grignon as a wedding gift for his wife, Mary Elizabeth Meade, in 1837. It became known as "The Mansion in the Woods" to travelers.

Currently, the Mansion serves as a museum.

References

External links

 

Department stores on the National Register of Historic Places
Hotels in Wisconsin
Houses completed in 1837
Houses on the National Register of Historic Places in Wisconsin
Commercial buildings on the National Register of Historic Places in Wisconsin
Museums in Outagamie County, Wisconsin
Houses in Outagamie County, Wisconsin
National Register of Historic Places in Outagamie County, Wisconsin
Greek Revival houses in Wisconsin